Marllely Vásconez Arteaga is a politician in Ecuador where she is the President of the commission on worker's rights and a member of the National Assembly.

Life
She qualified in law and gained a doctorate. After lecturing for twelve years at the Lay University Eloy Alfaro, she stood to be a member of the assembly. She was the Director of the Provincial Directorate of the Ministry of Economic and Social Inclusion in Manabi.

She is a member of PAIS Alliance and the President of the commission on worker's rights. She was involved in debate over the government's measures to improve public-private partnerships and in improving workers rights when bullying takes place in the workplace.

References

People from Manabí Province
Ecuadorian academics
Members of the National Assembly (Ecuador)
Women members of the National Assembly (Ecuador)
21st-century Ecuadorian women politicians
21st-century Ecuadorian politicians